Carotid artery may refer to:
 Common carotid artery, often "carotids" or "carotid", an artery on each side of the neck which divides into the external carotid artery and internal carotid artery
 External carotid artery, an artery on each side of the head and neck supplying blood to the face, scalp, skull, neck and meninges
 Internal carotid artery, an artery on each side of the head and neck supplying blood to the brain